Eleutherodactylus caribe is a species of frog in the family Eleutherodactylidae endemic to the Tiburon Peninsula, Haiti. Its natural habitat is coastal mangrove marsh. It is only known from one site near Dame-Marie where it was last seen in 1991. It is threatened by habitat loss.

References 

caribe
Frogs of Haiti
Endemic fauna of Haiti
Amphibians described in 1992
Taxonomy articles created by Polbot
Taxa named by Richard Thomas (herpetologist)
Taxa named by Stephen Blair Hedges